Hwange Town Airport  is an airport serving Hwange,
a mining town in Matabeleland North Province, Zimbabwe. The runway is adjacent to the town.

See also
Transport in Zimbabwe
List of airports in Zimbabwe

References

External links
OurAirports - Hwange
OpenStreetMap - Hwange
SkyVector Aeronautical Charts

Airports in Zimbabwe
Buildings and structures in Matabeleland North Province